Leigh Joseph McCloskey (born June 21, 1955) is an American actor, artist, author and philosopher.

Throughout his acting career, McCloskey appeared in numerous television series and movies, including the popular American soap opera Dallas and a leading role in the Dario Argento-helmed supernatural horror film Inferno.

As a painter, McCloskey has produced a number of works focused on occult, alchemical, and esoteric themes, including his own Tarot deck and The Hieroglyph of the Human Soul, a mixed-media art installation painted on the walls of his home library. His art work has been featured in popular music, including Flying Lotus’ 2010 release Cosmogramma and The Rolling Stones’ A Bigger Bang Tour in the 2000s.

Early life
Born in Los Angeles, California, McCloskey was classically trained as an actor at the Juilliard School in Lincoln Center, New York.

Acting 
He began his professional acting career playing Billy Abbott in the original miniseries Rich Man, Poor Man. He went on to star in three nighttime television series: Executive Suite, Married: The First Year, and performed the role of Mitch Cooper (husband of Lucy Ewing Cooper) on the CBS nighttime soap opera Dallas. McCloskey was a series regular from 1980–1982, and made brief appearances in 1985 and 1988.

McCloskey starred in made-for-television films and miniseries including The Bermuda Depths, Dawn: Portrait of a Teenage Runaway and its sequel Alexander: The Other Side of Dawn in which he played the title role. He was given the lead role in the Italian horror film Inferno (1980) after the director's original choice of James Woods proved to be unavailable. He starred in Trouble Shooters: Trapped Beneath the Earth and with Linda Gray (Dallas) in Accidental Meeting. He starred in the television miniseries Gone But Not Forgotten (2005). McCloskey has also appeared in the films Just One of the Guys, Cameron's Closet, Fraternity Vacation with Tim Robbins, among others.

McCloskey has guest-starred on television series and pilots including Bones, Star Trek: Deep Space Nine, Star Trek: Voyager, Jake and the Fatman, JAG, Life Goes On, Chicago Hope, Medical Center, and many others. He has played villains on four sci-fi television series: Star Trek: Deep Space Nine and Star Trek: Voyager, as well as Babylon 5 (2 parts) and Buck Rogers in the 25th Century with Dorothy Stratten. He has also appeared in a number of daytime soap operas, including Santa Barbara, General Hospital, The Young and the Restless and One Life to Live.

Painting 
While working on Dallas, McCloskey found himself dissatisfied with mainstream success and began exploring painting and writing as a means of creative fulfillment.

His work as a visual artist explores religion, mythology, philosophy, esotericism and human consciousness, and reflects his deep study of Hermeticism, Alchemy and Kabbalah.

Inspired by his study with astrologer and teacher Edwin Charles Steinbrecher, McCloskey designed his own pen-drawn black-and-white Tarot, known as Tarot ReVisioned.

McCloskey's most notable accomplishment as a visual artist is generally considered to be The Hieroglyph of the Human Soul, an installation work painted on the walls of his personal library.

The Hieroglyph is a mixed-media acrylic mural that depicts the archetypal story of creation and evolution of the human soul, through which McCloskey gives guided tours to reveal its rich symbolism. One critic wrote, “Stepping into The Hieroglyph of the Human Soul, the visitor is transported into a liminal space of consciousness that is at once a library and a temple, a stage and a studio, a cave painting and a cathedral. In this place of strange convergence, McCloskey performs the simultaneous roles of artist and critic, actor and director, shaman and prophet. Like Thoth-Hermes, McCloskey is both author and librarian of a living language.”

He began work on The Hieroglyph of the Human Soul in response to the September 11 attacks. He said, “The coming down of the Twin Towers is what triggered The Hieroglyph of the Human Soul… [It’s] the falling away of the old binary: the two brothers, the Piscean fish. One [is] the man of god, the [other is the] man of money. The two kings who grow higher and higher like the Tower of Babel, only in jealousy to fall back to earth—and we are left in the rubble.”

Some interesting synchronicities have revealed themselves in The Hieroglyph of the Human Soul. McCloskey discovered that the colors appear to be in 3D when viewed with ChromaDepth 3D glasses, creating an immersive multidimensional effect. He said, "I wasn't expecting it to be 3D; I didn't figure out how to do it. It was inherent in the questions I was asking, as if consciousness itself is saying, 'You see, I'm far more clever than you think I am, because you think I'm as clever as you are, and you're not that clever.'"

Another interesting synchronicity is that the acronym of The Hieroglyph of the Human Soul is T.H.O.T.H.S., alluding to the Thoth, the ancient Egyptian god of wisdom, writing, hieroglyphs, science, magic, art, judgment, and the dead. McCloskey has called the work "Thoth's library."

The Hieroglyph of the Human Soul is composed in what McCloskey calls "Watcher Language." In 2003, the Watcher Language was granted copyright as a graphic language.

His painting Phoenix Arise was the focus of a 2012 TEDx talk that McCloskey presented in Malibu, CA. Images from McCloskey's Codex Tor were featured on the cover and sleeve of Flying Lotus’ 2010 multi-award-winning album Cosmogramma.

Imagery from McCloskey’s Grimoire (itself an unused prop from the E. Elias Merhige horror film Shadow of the Vampire) was prominently featured on The Rolling Stones' A Bigger Bang Tour in the 2000s.

Publications 
In 2003, McCloskey published the book Tarot ReVisioned through Olandar Press. It serves as an exegesis for his pen-drawn black-and-white interpretation of the Hermetic Tarot. In it, he discusses "paths of initiation, myth of origins and the profound philosophical implications of symbolism, Hermeticism, alchemy and the Grail."

Upon its publication, American occult historian Mitch Horowitz likened Tarot ReVisioned to Manly P. Hall's classic esoteric tome The Secret Teaching of All Ages.

McCloskey has also published Codex Tor I & II (which served as the cover for Flying Lotus' Cosmogramma), Adam Reborn & Eve Restored, and In the Splendor.

Philosophy 
McCloskey considers himself a “visual philosopher.”

While speaking on aesthetics, McCloskey remarked, “True beauty is Saturnian… [S]he says, ‘You have earned me. You have not been entitled to me.’ Jupiter might have said, ‘Simply because you’re grand you can have me.’ But Saturn says, ‘No, I remain… the Devil, the Dweller at the Threshold, he who sees all of the weakness of your argument.’ [He] essentially torments you until you become worthy; no one can do it for you. You must become self-redeemed. [A]nd so doing you become honorable. You go from being a soldier—a coward of authority—to becoming a Grail Knight, worthy of great beauty because you honor not what you have taken but what you can finally see.”

On the subject of consciousness, McCloskey has said, "The knowledge of the father is I think therefore I am, and the knowledge of the mother is I love therefore I am… That is the right angle of the human heart: When I think, I think I am not you. When I love, I know we are one."

Of the human condition, McCloskey states, “Only when you return to what is intimate in your human heart can you find the truth that you are not alone, but that you are in all ages simultaneously, and you are woven of the entire whole and holy story of being human.”

Personal life 
McCloskey lives in Malibu, CA with his wife Carla. They host public events at their home including workshops, film screenings, and internationally recognized speakers. During these events, McCloskey gives personal tours of The Hieroglyph of the Human Soul.

For the past 40 years, the McCloskeys have hosted weekly discussion groups at their home, with topics ranging from Theosophy to Jungian psychology.

In 2018, McCloskey's home was threatened during the Woolsey Fire. With the help of fellow soap opera star A Martinez, McCloskey was able to defend his home from destruction by the fire.

Filmography

References

External links
 
 
 

1955 births
Male actors from Los Angeles
Artists from California
American male film actors
American male soap opera actors
American male television actors
Juilliard School alumni
Living people
Visionary artists